Amin Hamid Howeidi (22 September 1921–31 October 2009) was an Egyptian military leader, author  and defense minister under Nasser's rule.

Early life and education
Howeidi was born in Munufiya on 22 September 1921. He attended the Egyptian Military Academy and graduated in 1940. He held a master's degree in military sciences from the Chief of Staff College which he received in 1951. Then he attended the United States Army Command and General Staff College (CGSC) at Fort Leavenworth and obtained another master's degree in military sciences in 1955. Next, he obtained a master's degree in translation, press and publication from Cairo University in 1956.

Career
After his graduation Howeidi began to work as a teacher at the Military Academy. Later, he became a professor at the Military Chief of Staff College. In addition, he served as the head of military operations planning in the Armed Forces Command. He was part of the Free Officers who inaugurated the 1952 revolution in Egypt. Then he began to hold public posts. His offices included ambassador to Morocco (1962–1963), ambassador to Iraq (1963–1965), minister of national guidance (1965–1966), and minister of state for cabinet affairs (1966–1967).

Howeidi was appointed defense minister and director of general intelligence by Gamal Abdel Nasser after the defeat of Egypt in the Six-Day War. His term as defense minister began in June 1967, replacing Shams Badran in the post. Howeidi's term ended in March 1968, and he was succeeded by Mohammed Fawzi as defense minister. Howeidi served as director of general intelligence from 1967 to 1970.

Arrest
In 1971, Howeidi was detained along with 91 others accused of treason, and then tried at the Revolutionary Tribunal. He was sentenced to house arrest for nearly 10 years.

Personal life
Howeidi was married and had two children, a daughter and a son.

Publications
Howeidi was the author of various books, including How Zionist Leaders Think, Lost Opportunities, 50 Years of Storms: Telling What I saw and The 1967 War: The Secrets and Mysteries. In addition, he wrote op-eds for Al Ahram Weekly.

Death
Howeidi died on 31 October 2009 at the age of 88.

References

20th-century Egyptian diplomats
20th-century Egyptian politicians
20th-century Egyptian writers
1921 births
2009 deaths
Ambassadors of Egypt to Iraq
Ambassadors of Egypt to Morocco
Cairo University alumni
Defence Ministers of Egypt
Directors of the General Intelligence Directorate (Egypt)
Egyptian expatriates in the United States
Egyptian Military Academy alumni
Egyptian military leaders
Egyptian prisoners and detainees
Free Officers Movement (Egypt)
Non-U.S. alumni of the Command and General Staff College